The Crispi II government of Italy held office from 9 March 1889 until 6 February 1891, a total of 699 days, or 1 year, 10 months and 28 days.

Government parties
The government was composed by the following parties:

Composition

References

Italian governments
1889 establishments in Italy